Oakton College is a public community college with campuses in Des Plaines, Illinois and Skokie, Illinois. It was established in 1969 in Morton Grove, Illinois and moved to its current locations in 1980.

History
Oakton College opened in 1969 in former industrial buildings at Oakton and Nagle in Morton Grove. This original campus closed when the Des Plaines and Skokie campuses opened in 1980. The Skokie campus opened in 1980 at the site of the former Niles East High School, an art deco architecture building that was used in the films Sixteen Candles and Risky Business. The school produced two Nobel laureates. A photograph of the school from 1993 is in the collection of the local historical society. The college demolished the school buildings. Oakton College's Koehnline Museum of Art has about 40 film posters from African American films. It announced on 2 January 2023 that it will be renamed Oakton College as of 17 January, with updated logo and branding to roll out over the next year.

Des Plaines Campus
Special facilities include 19 computer classrooms; a Performing Arts Center; the Business Institute; the William A. Koehnline Museum of Art; a Child Care Center; and a teleconferencing center, gym, fitness center, library and bookstore. The Des Plaines Campus has about 10,000 students enrolled.

Construction on a new addition to the northeast side of the campus began in April 2012, with a projected open date in time for the 2014 summer semester. However, due to weather and issues with the concrete slab used for the ground settlement, the building was not available for use until the spring semester of 2015. The $39 million addition, which stands three stories tall and spans 93,000 square feet, is the largest structural change to the campus since its opening in 1980. The new building, which houses health and sciences classes, is part of a $68.5 million five year Facilities Master Plan which went into effect in December 2010. The community college will seek certification with the Leadership in Energy and Environmental Design due to its features, which include self shading windows which will provide natural lighting to 75 percent of the classrooms during the day. In honor of President Margaret Burke Lee and her planned retirement in June 2015 after 30 years of service, the building has been named the Margaret Burke Lee Science and Health Careers Center.

Joianne L. Smith is the college's fourth president.

Skokie Campus
The Ray Hartstein Campus adjoins a residential area in Skokie. The state-of-the-art building was dedicated in 1995 and is set on a spacious lawn with mature trees as well as new plantings. The building provides almost  of space for 31 classrooms, 12 laboratories and other educational and administrative offices. Special facilities include a teleconferencing and distance learning center; a Child Care Center; and offices for student activities, the Emeritus Program, Alliance for Lifelong Learning (ALL) and English as a Second Language (ESL)/Literacy.

Academics
The college offers both credit and non-credit classes. Some credit classes include courses in Accounting, Computer Science, Humanities, Mathematics, etc. Oakton College is accredited by The Higher Learning Commission and the North Central Association.

In 2014, Oakton entered into a dual enrollment agreement with Shimer College, a Great Books Program college in Chicago, under which Oakton students could attend Shimer classes for credit at Oakton.  It was the first extension of Shimer's dual enrollment system beyond the City Colleges of Chicago.

Student life
Oakton College is a member of National Junior College Athletic Association (NJCAA), and offers men's teams in baseball, basketball, cross country, golf, soccer, tennis, and track and field; and women's teams in basketball, cross country, golf, soccer, softball, tennis, track and field, and volleyball. Students may also participate in a variety of intramural sports on campus.

There are over 50 clubs on campus. The community college also has a Student Government Association, Student Judicial Board, the student newspaper OCCurrence, and other student led programs.

Area served
Cook County Suburban Community College District 535 serves 450,000 residents in northeast Cook County, Illinois. The school serves Chicago's North Shore suburbs of Des Plaines, Evanston, Glencoe, Glenview, Golf, Kenilworth, Lincolnwood, Morton Grove, Niles, Northbrook, Northfield, Park Ridge, Rosemont, Skokie, Wilmette, and Winnetka.

References

External links
 

Community colleges in Illinois
Education in Skokie, Illinois
Des Plaines, Illinois
Educational institutions established in 1969
Universities and colleges in Cook County, Illinois
1969 establishments in Illinois
NJCAA athletics